Eelco Schattorie (born 18 December 1971) is a Dutch football manager.

Career
Born in Swalmen, Schattorie started as a youth and assistant coach, later becoming the caretaker manager and finally Technical Director for Youth Development with Dutch club VVV-Venlo. In 1996 he served as the club's head coach on a caretaker basis for four matches in 1996 after former head coach, Jan Versleijen, left the club. During his 3 league games and single cup game in charge, he earned the unusual record of being the club's only undefeated coach in history, an achievement he still retains. This run started with a 0-1 victory at FC Dordrecht away game, another victory against FC Emmen at home and a draw at FC den Bosch. One of his biggest achievements during his twelve-year stay at VVV Venlo was successfully bringing a lot of talents from the youth academy to the first team.

In 1999 he successfully obtained the highest tier UEFA PRO license at age 28. He was the youngest coach ever to obtain the UEFA PRO License under the official guidelines of the Dutch Football Association the KNVB. Over the course of his career Eelco maintained over a 53.4% win rate as head coach.

In 2002 Schattorie moved to the United Arab Emirates in 2002 to rejoin Jan Versleljen as Assistant Manager and under-18 manager at Al Jazira. After spending a season in the UAE, Schattorie followed Versleijen to Saudi Arabia to again work as an assistant with Al-Ettifaq. He also later worked as assistant coach to Versleijen at another Emirati club, Al-Shaab. Schattorie returned to Al-Ettifaq in 2008 as under-23 head coach and helped the side win the Prince Faisal bin Fahd Cup. Schattorie then moved to Oman where he served as Technical Director at Muscat Club.

Schattorie became the head coach of Bahraini club, Al-Riffa before returning to Muscat Club as their head coach in 2007. After joining the club when they were at the bottom of the table, Schattorie managed to help the capital side finish eighth in the division, safe from relegation. He then stayed with the club till February 2009, when he became the head coach of Omani side, Fanja. After going undefeated for most of the season during the 2009–10 season, Fanja were defeated in the promotion play-offs against Al-Oruba. Despite the season going very well for Schattorie, he was still let go by the club. Schattorie soon moved back to Saudi Arabia where he became head coach of Al-Khaleej in 2010. After spending years in the Middle-East, Schattorie moved to Africa where he signed as head coach of Red Bull Ghana from 2011 to 2012.

Red Bull Ghana: 2011–2012 
Eelco Schattorie joined the Red Bull Salzburg establishment in February 2011. He was appointed head coach at the Red Bull Ghana Academy in Africa. On his arrival the first team had 5 games to go and had to be saved from Relegation. Eelco managed to preserve the team's league status and started the new season building a team with the next new talents. In his brief time in Ghana, Eelco was able to assess and develop a number of young prospects and guide them into successful careers. One of the talents Patrick Twumasi who was playing as a winger under his former coach was retrained by Eelco into a striker position. His career took off from there and is currently playing for FC Astana and the Ghana national team. Eelco parted ways with the club when Red Bull pulled the plug because of organizational reasons, and the club's subsequent merger with Feyenoord from the Netherlands.

Prayag United: 2012–2014
On 9 November 2012 it was announced that Schattorie would become the new head coach of Prayag United of the I-League in India, taking over on match-day 6 of the 2012-13 I-league. He managed his first game in India on 10 November 2012, where he led Prayag United to a 10–1 victory over newly promoted United Sikkim. Schattorie won his first and only cup for the side on 20 March 2013 when Prayag United defeated East Bengal in the IFA Shield final 1–0 through a Ranti Martins goal. Eelco eventually finished the 2012–13 campaign leading Prayag United to a fourth-place finish.

Unfortunately, entering the 2013–14 season, Prayag United were hit hard financially by the chit fund scam. After successfully dealing with the trouble given to him by sponsors, Eelco left the club in January 2014.

East Bengal: 2015
On 19 February 2015 it was announced that Schattorie would return to the I-League to manage East Bengal. However, he lost his first match in charge by four goals to one, in an AFC Cup match, against Johor Darul Ta'zim. Schattorie then managed the club in the I-League for the first time on 1 March 2015 against Dempo at the Fatorda Stadium. Five goals from Ranti Martins saw East Bengal come out as 5–1 winners.

After the season ended, Schattorie left the club and was replaced by Biswajit Bhattacharya.

Al-Ettifaq: 2016-2017 
In August 2016, Eelco joined Al-Ettifaq for the 4th time. The goal was to promote their Olympic Team to the highest division of Saudi Arabian football. On the 29 October 2016 Eelco replaced Tunisian Head coach Djamel Belkacem and defeated Al Tawoon 3-0 in his first game in charge of Ettifaq. As agreed before the game Eelco would step back to the Olympic Team and Spanish coach Juan Carlos Garrido took over the rest of the season. on 18 February 2017 Juan Carlos Garrido was sacked after a very disappointing 12 games no winning streak, and Eelco was again called upon as caretaker coach and saw out the rest of the Season. Eelco was in charge for the last 9 games and saved the team from relegation.

NorthEast United
On 4 January 2018 Eelco was appointed as the assistant coach of Avram Grant in Northeast United and after Grant left the head coach position and remained as technical advisor. On 17 August 2018, it was announced that Eelco has joined Indian Super League club Northeast United as the head coach for the season 2018-19. Under him Northeast United reached to the playoffs for the first time in club's history.

Kerala Blasters
On 19 May 2019, Eelco was announced as the head coach of Indian Super League club Kerala Blasters for the 2019-20 season. Even though Eelco was a fan favorite in Kerala for his style of football, he could only manage the club to finish 7th in the league. After the disappointed season, Kerala Blasters have parted ways with the  Eelco  in 22 April 2020. Under him Kerala Blasters registerd their highest ever victory against Hyderabad FC

Al Seeb Club 

On 25th September 2021, Eelco was announced as the head coach of  Oman Professional League club  Al Seeb SC. 

On 8 December 2021, due to personal reasons, he announced that he have resigned as the manager of Al Seeb.

Managerial statistics

Managerial record

References

1971 births
Living people
People from Swalmen
Sportspeople from Limburg (Netherlands)
Dutch football managers
Fanja SC managers
Khaleej FC managers
Red Bull Ghana managers
United SC managers
East Bengal Club managers
NorthEast United FC head coaches
Kerala Blasters FC head coaches
Oman Professional League managers
I-League managers
Saudi First Division League managers
Saudi Professional League managers
Indian Super League head coaches
Dutch expatriate football managers
Dutch expatriate sportspeople in the United Arab Emirates
Dutch expatriate sportspeople in Bahrain
Dutch expatriate sportspeople in Oman
Dutch expatriate sportspeople in Saudi Arabia
Dutch expatriate sportspeople in Ghana
Dutch expatriate sportspeople in India
Expatriate football managers in the United Arab Emirates
Expatriate football managers in Bahrain
Expatriate football managers in Oman
Expatriate football managers in Saudi Arabia
Expatriate football managers in Ghana
Expatriate football managers in India
NorthEast United FC managers
VVV-Venlo managers